Gilles Lelievre is a French slalom canoeist who competed from the late 1980s to the mid-1990s. He won three gold medals in the C2 team event at the ICF Canoe Slalom World Championships, earning them in 1987, 1989 and 1991.

He also won the overall World Cup title in C2 in 1989.

His partner in the boat throughout the whole of his active career was Jérôme Daille.

World Cup individual podiums

References
Overview of athlete's results at canoeslalom.net

French male canoeists
Living people
Year of birth missing (living people)
Medalists at the ICF Canoe Slalom World Championships